Anton Starkop (22 April 1889 Röa, Rapla County – 30 December 1966 Tartu) was Estonian sculptor.

1911-1912 he studied at Anton Ažbe Art School in Munich and 1912–1913 at Académie Russe and Académie de la Grande Chaumière in Paris.

During the World War I, he was war prisoner in Dresden, Germany.

1918 he returned to Estonia. There he was one of the founder of Pallas Art School. 1919-1940 he was teacher and 1929-1940 also the director of this school. He was married to Estonian artist Lydia Mei from 1920 to 1928 .

1944-1950 he was head of sculpture chair at Tartu State Art Institute and 1945-1948 its director.

1950 he moved to Moscow. There he worked in Merkurov's studio.

Notable works
 Drowning Man
 Sunbather
 Mother and Child

References

1889 births
1966 deaths
20th-century Estonian sculptors
20th-century Estonian male artists
People from Rapla Parish